Syzygium thompsonii (Chamorro: atoto), is a tree endemic to the islands of Guam, Rota, and Saipan with a striking appearance due to its abundance of white flowers and edible fruit that grow directly from the trunk.  It is related to the Malay apple, but bears fruits that are smaller and tart.

Description 
Edward D. Merrill, in An Enumeration of the Plants of Guam (1914), described the tree using specimens sent to him from Guam:

 "A tall tree, quite glabrous.  Branches and branchlets terete, reddish-brown or sometimes grayish-red, mostly smooth.  Leaves opposite, coriaceous, oblong-ovate to oblong-lanceolate, 10 to 18 cm long, 3 to 6.5 cm wide, the base rather abruptly and broadly rounded, distinctly cordate, narrowed above to the acute or obtuse apex, the margins somewhat recurved, upper surface brownish-olivaceous, shining, the lower somewhat paler, dull or but slightly shining; lateral nerves about 10 on each side of the midrib, distant, anastomosing, the reticulations lax; petioles stout, 3 mm long or less.  Flowers in panicles which are fascicled on the trunk, the panicles 10 to 20 cm long, narrowly pyramidal, the lower branches 5 to 7 cm long, the upper shorter, all opposite, 3 or 4 pairs to each panicle, mostly spreading.  Flowers for the most part in threes at the ends of the ultimate branchlets, their pedicels short, 1 to 3 mm long.  Calyx funnel-shaped, 8 to 10 mm long, the lobes 4, very broad and short, not prominent.  Petals 4, free, orbicular-reniform, rounded, 6 to 7 mm in diameter, prominently glandular.  Stamens indefinite; filaments 6 to 8 mm long; anthers 1 mm long.  Fruit when dry about 1.5 cm long, 1 cm in diameter, truncate, black, base rounded, ovoid-ellipsoid."
F. Raymond Fosberg, in The Flora of Guam (1970), mostly quotes Merrill's description, except:

 The leaf measurements are 8–18 cm long, 3–8 cm wide.
 Panicles of flowers may arise from the first branch or the trunk.
 Panicles of flowers may have a few basal pairs of leaves (or none), branches about 4–8 cm long.
 Fruit subglobose-ovoid and colored dark red.
 Fruits contain 1 or 2 seeds.
Neil Snow & Jan Veldkamp wrote that the specimens from Guam seemed to "have more or less flattened branchlets with buds 11-13 mm long."  This differed from specimens from Rota and Saipan, which "tend to be slightly 4-angled and have buds (6-)7-8.5 mm long," suggesting these qualify as separate sub-species.

Distribution and habitat 
Syzygium thompsonii is a canopy tree found in limestone forests. It is listed as endemic only to the 3 southernmost Mariana islands: Guam, Rota and Saipan. The Smithsonian herbarium contains two specimens from Saipan, one from Water Cave and the other from the north slope of Mt. Tapochau. However, the Global Biodiversity Information Facility (GBIF) database (which include data from iNaturalist) includes no specimens from Saipan.

Ecology 
Although the critically-endangered Rota white-eye (Zosterops rotensis) is primarily insectivorous, it has been observed feeding on various fruits, including that of Syzygium thompsonii.

No insects were reported to have been collected from Syzygium thompsonii, based on a search of the  Bishop Museum's Insects of Micronesia publications between 1955 and 2017.

A 2018 survey of the Northwest Field in northern Guam observed 36 specimens of the federally threatened orchid, Tuberolabium guamense, growing on three Syzygium thompsonii trees.

Conservation status 
Syzygium thompsonii has not been assessed by the International Union for Conservation of Nature (IUCN).  A 2000 survey of plots on Anderson Airforce Base land in norther Guam found no Syzygium thompsonii trees, nor did the 2008 Botanical survey of the War in the Pacific National Historical Park Guam, which includes limestone forest in west-central Guam.  A 2013 forest inventory identified Syzygium thompsonii on only 2 of 48 island-wide plots, but estimated there were 178,000 trees on Guam (although with a substantial sampling error of 172,000).  This inventory found Syzygium thompsonii to be the 29th most common tree of 49 species listed.  Syzygium thompsonii accounted for 0.24% of all trees identified.  All specimens were small, measuring between 1.0 and 4.9 inches diameter at breast height.  The 2018 survey of the Northwest Field on Guam found Syzygium thompsonii occurrence as "Occasional."

History 

Syzygium thompsonii is not mentioned by Charles Gaudichaud from his 1819 botanical expedition of the Marianas, nor by William E. Safford in his 1905 Useful Plants of Guam.  The earliest known specimens were collected in 1913 by John B. Thompson, who was the Director of the US Department of Agriculture's Guam Agricultural Experiment Station, and are now kept in the Royal Botanic Gardens of Kew.  The species was first described the following year by E.D. Merrill in The Philippine Journal of Science (1914), who was sent specimens by Thompson.  Merrill originally named the species Eugenia thompsonii sp. nov.  Eventually, these specimens were lost from the Philippine National Herbarium due to fire from bombing during World War II.  Merrill includes a description of the tree as a "striking species" due to its foliage and the abundance of cauline flowers (growing directly from the trunk).

L. Diels (1921) provided a brief description of the tree, which he named Jambosa thompsonii.  He also provided the indigenous name "makupa halomtano," måkupa being the CHamorro name for the Malay apple, which is cultivated on Guam, and hålom tåno' meaning literally "interior land," or of the forest.

The first record of the CHamorro name, atoto, is reported to be Fosberg in 1946.  However, the species is not mentioned in Fosberg's The Vegetation of Micronesia (1960).  Stone, in The Flora of Guam (1970), commented on its rarity on Guam, and described the tree as "a fine, handsome species worthy of cultivation."

In 2010, Snow & Veldkamp reclassified the species as Syzygium thompsonii (Merr.) N.Snow comb. nov., which is now the accepted species name.  These authors also advised that the species should be merged with Syzygium trukense and Syzygium stelechanthum, both from the Caroline Islands.  However, Costion and Lorence disagreed with the merger, arguing that the Syzygium trukense species grow on volcanic soils of Chuuk, whereas the species on Guam is restricted to the northern limestone forest, and has not been found growing in the volcanic soils of southern Guam.  They further commented that it would be an unlikely geographical distribution involving only the southern Marianas Island and Chuuk.  The Plants of the World Online database continues to list these 3 species as distinct from each other.

References 

thompsonii
Flora of Guam